The Frissbee GR2 and Frissbee GR3 were American sports prototype racing cars, built by Frissbee in 1981 and 1982, respectively, for the Can-Am series. Originally built by Lola Cars as a Lola T332 Formula 5000 car; and featured a 5-liter Chevrolet V8 engine. It was then converted into the Spyder Can-Am car in California, raced for Newman-Freeman racing, and was driven by Keke Rosberg among others. It eventually evolved into its current iteration, and was later driven by Danny Sullivan, Robert Meyer, Al Unser Jr., Jacques Villeneuve, Sr., Horst Kroll and Rick Miaskiewicz, between 1982 and 1985. It was later sold to Colin Poole of Plum Tree Racing in England and competed there between 1987 and 1989.

References

Sports prototypes
Can-Am cars
Lola racing cars